Winnie Owens-Hart (born 1949) is an American ceramist and sculptor.

Life 
Born in Washington, D.C., Owens-Hart received a Bachelor of Fine Arts degree from the University of the Arts in Philadelphia, followed by a Master of Fine Arts degree from Howard University.

She has exhibited in many solo and group shows, both in the United States and abroad. She has been a visiting artist at Awolwo University, Ile Ife, Nigeria, the Penland School of Crafts, and the McColl Center for Visual Art, Sierra Nevada College, and artist-in-resident at Pewabic Pottery, Baltimore Clay Works, Watershed, North Edgecomb, and Haystack Mountain School of Crafts.

Among museums which hold examples of her work is the Renwick Gallery of the Smithsonian Institution; she has created public artwork for Arlington County, Virginia, and has worked at the Samuel S. Fleisher Art Memorial in Philadelphia. She has received an Individual Craftsman Fellowship from the National Endowment for the Arts.  Currently, Owens-Hart teaches at Howard University.

Honors and awards 

 Honorary Board Member, Renwick Museum, Smithsonian Institution
 Lifetime Achievement in the Craft Arts Award, Renwick Fellow, Smithsonian Institution
 Fellow, Smithsonian Institution Faculty Research Program
 National Endowment for the Arts – Individual Craftsmen Fellowship, 1978

References

1949 births
Living people
American women ceramists
American ceramists
American women sculptors
20th-century American sculptors
20th-century American women artists
21st-century American sculptors
21st-century American women artists
University of the Arts (Philadelphia) alumni
Howard University alumni
Howard University faculty
Artists from Washington, D.C.
African-American sculptors
National Endowment for the Arts Fellows
21st-century ceramists
American women academics
20th-century African-American women
20th-century African-American people
20th-century African-American artists
21st-century African-American women
21st-century African-American artists